Azanus sitalces, the large Madagascar babul blue, is a butterfly in the family Lycaenidae. It is found on Madagascar and the Comoros. The habitat consists of forests.

Subspecies
Azanus sitalces sitalces (Madagascar)
Azanus sitalces mayotti d'Abrera, 1980 (Comoros: Mayotte)

References

Butterflies described in 1900
Azanus
Butterflies of Africa
Taxa named by Paul Mabille